Sea of the Ear is a public sculpture by Takashi Soga located in Lincoln Park on the north side of Milwaukee, Wisconsin. Sea of the Ear - Floating Cylinder is a kinetic work made of galvanized steel and painted bright red. The artwork was commissioned by the Milwaukee County Percent for Art Program.

References

Outdoor sculptures in Milwaukee
2009 sculptures
Kinetic sculptures in the United States
Steel sculptures in Wisconsin